in the Empire of Japan was a continuation of a long tradition beginning in the feudal period of Japan. Government censorship of the press existed in Japan during the Edo period, as the Tokugawa bakufu was in many ways a police state, which sought to control the spread of information, including Christianity, the influx of Western ideas, pornography and any political writings critical of the shōgun and government.

Meiji Period (1868–1912)
With the Meiji Restoration, the focus of state censorship of information shifted to protection of the Emperor and the fledgling Meiji government. Initially intended to serve as a copyright law, it was quickly adopted as a method of controlling public anti-government criticism.

With the establishment of the cabinet system of government, the Home Ministry was assigned this task, and issued a variety of regulations aimed specifically at newspapers. The growth of the Freedom and People's Rights Movement caused a reaction by conservative elements within the government to pass strict libel laws in 1875, and also a draconian  that was so severe that it was labeled the “newspaper abolition law” as it empowered the Home Minister to ban or shut down offending newspapers which the government deemed offensive to public order or state security. The ordinance was further strengthened in revisions of 1887, which extended penalties to authors as well as publishers, and also restricted the import of foreign language newspapers with objectionable material.

During the First Sino-Japanese War of 1894–1895, and the Russo-Japanese War of 1904–1905, the Army Ministry also imposed separate censorship restrictions in time of war.

Taishō period (1912–1926)
Although the Taishō period is stereotyped as one of liberal politics, it was also a period of great social upheaval, and the government became increasingly heavy-handed in its attempts to control the spread of new political philosophies deemed dangerous to the government: especially socialism, communism, and anarchism. After the end of World War I, the Peace Preservation Law of 1925 increased police powers to prosecute promoters of socialism and of the Korean independence movement. Censorship restrictions were also expanded to cover religious groups. In 1928, the death penalty was added for certain violations, and the Special Higher Police Force (Tokkō) was created to deal with ideological offenses (i.e. thought crimes) on a national basis.

Early Shōwa Period (1926–1945)
In 1924, the Publications Monitoring Department of the Home Ministry was created with separate sections for censorship, investigation and general affairs. With the outbreak of the Second Sino-Japanese War, the Home Ministry, Army Ministry, Navy Ministry and Ministry of Foreign Affairs all held regular meetings with publishers to provide advice on how to follow the ever-stringent regulations. Penalties for violations increased in severity, and voice recordings (including radio broadcasts) also came under official purview.

In 1936, an Information and Propaganda Committee was created within the Home Ministry, which issued all official press statements, and which worked together with the Publications Monitoring Department on censorship issues. Besides applying censorship to all medias of the Shōwa regime and issuing detailed guidelines to publishers, it made suggestions that were all but commands. From 1938, print media "would come to realize that their survival depended upon taking cues from the Cabinet Information Bureau and its flagship publication, Shashin shūhō, designers of the 'look' of the soldier, and the 'look' of the war".

Article 12 of the censorship guideline for newspapers issued on September 1937 stated that any news article or photograph "unfavorable" to the Imperial Army was subject to a gag. Article 14 prohibited any "photographs of atrocities" but endorsed reports about the "cruelty of the Chinese" soldiers and civilians.

Giving the example of the Nanjing massacre, Tokushi Kasahara of Tsuru University asserts, "Some deniers argue that Nanjing was much more peaceful than we generally think. They always show some photographs with Nanjing refugees selling some food in the streets or Chinese people smiling in the camps. They are forgetting about Japanese propaganda. The Imperial Army imposed strict censorship. Any photographs with dead bodies couldn't get through. So photographers had to remove all the bodies before taking pictures of streets and buildings in the city ... Even if the photos were not staged, the refugees had no choice but to fawn on the Japanese soldiers. Acting otherwise meant their deaths ..."

One of the most famous examples of censorship is related to Mugi to heitai (Wheat and soldiers), Ashihei Hino's wartime bestseller. A paragraph in which the author described the beheading of three Chinese soldiers was cut from the final section of the book despite the author's dedication to the war effort.

The new Jōhōkyoku had complete control over all news, advertising and public events. It was headed by a president (sōsai) responsible directly to the Prime minister with a staff of about 600 people including military officers and officials from the Home and Foreign ministries. In February 1941 it distributed among editors a black list of writers whose articles they were advised not to print anymore.

The officials spokesmen of the Naikaku Johōkyoku, such as the vice-president Hideo Okumura, Major-General Nakao Nahagi and Captain Hideo Hiraide, became themselves the most popular commentators. These men addressed press conferences, spoke on the radio and wrote in newspapers.

The Naikaku Johōkyoku however dealt only with civilian matters. War bulletins were the domain of the Daihonei hōdōbu, the Press Department of the Imperial General Headquarters which was made up of the press sections of the Army and the Navy. The Daihonei hōdōbu deployed its own war correspondents and occasionally drafted civilian reporters for coverage.

The 1941 revision of the  eliminated freedom of the press completely. All mail was also subject to scrutiny. In February 1942, all newspapers were ordered to merge, or to cease publication. The Japan Publishers League, reorganized in the Japan Publishers Association agreed to cooperate with the government by conducting internal monitoring of its members by a self-screening of drafts, manuscripts and proofs before final submission to the official government censors. As the war situation deteriorated, the government took over the distribution of paper, releasing supplies only for matter related to official policy. By 1944, only 34 magazines were left in publication, and by 1945, only one newspaper was permitted per prefecture.

Occupation of Japan

After the surrender of Japan in 1945, the Supreme Commander of the Allied Powers abolished all forms of censorship and controls on freedom of speech, which was also integrated into Article 21 of the 1947 Constitution of Japan. However, press censorship remained a reality in the post-war era, especially in matters of pornography, and in political matters deemed subversive by the American government during the occupation of Japan.

According to David M. Rosenfeld:

See also
Political repression in Imperial Japan
Censorship in Japan
Dōmei Tsushin—the official news agency of the Empire of Japan

References

Further reading

External links 
 Japanese Press Translations 1945-46 from the Dartmouth College Digital Collections

Censorship in Japan
Politics of the Empire of Japan